Rubén Ramírez Hidalgo was the defending champion; however, he lost to Evgeny Donskoy in the second round.

Simon Greul won the final against Victor Crivoi 6–2, 6–1.

Seeds

Draw

Finals

Top half

Bottom half

References
Main Draw
Qualifying Singles

Kosice Open - Singles
2011 Singles